Charlie Brown (born 20 October 1986) is a British singer and songwriter from London. He supported N-Dubz star Dappy on his UK tour in 2012. His single "On My Way" was released by All Around the World Productions.

Career

2012–present: Breakthrough
On 2 December 2012, Brown released his debut single "Dependency", the song features vocals from Yungen and Ms D. He released his second single "She Makes Me" on 19 December 2012. He released the single "On My Way" which was released by All Around the World Productions on 24 March 2013, the song peaked at number seven on the UK Singles Chart, making it his first and only top ten single. In July 2013 he released the single "Floodgates". On 8 June he had duetted with Misha B on "Floodgates Part 2", which was officially released 21 July. He released the single "Bones" on 13 October 2013.

Discography

Singles

Music videos

References

Living people
English pop singers
1986 births
21st-century English singers